Ethan Owen Liam Johnston (born 13 June 2002) is an English footballer who plays as a forward for Banbury United.

Career
On 18 February 2020, Johnston signed his first professional contract with Northampton Town. Johnston made his professional debut with Northampton Town in a 4-0 EFL Cup loss to Bristol City on 16 September 2020. On 11 May 2021, Johnston was one of six players released by Northampton Town.

On 28 July 2021, Johnston signed for Southern League Premier Division Central side Banbury United.

References

External links
 
 NTFC Profile

2002 births
Living people
Sportspeople from Kettering
English footballers
Association football forwards
Northampton Town F.C. players
Banbury United F.C. players